Manuel Argüello Mora was born in San José, Costa Rica in 1834. He is one of the foremost Costa Rican authors, and with 1888's Misterio, was its first novelist. He obtained his education at the University of Santo Tomás in Costa Rica and the Universidad de San Carlos in Guatemala, where he obtained a degree in law. Orphaned at a young age, he was brought up by his uncle Juan Rafael Mora Porras, the president of Costa Rica between 1849 and 1859, and his historical novel La trinchera recounts Mora Porras' campaign against William Walker's forces in Nicaragua in 1856. After Mora Porras was deposed, he followed his uncle into exile in Europe in 1859. He returned in 1860 during Mora Porras' attempt to regain power, and was spared from the firing squad which executed the former president. Between 1860 and 1902 he served on the Costa Rican Supreme Court and was the rector of the University of Santo Tomás. Along with writing within a number of genres, he also founded the weekly newspaper La Reforma. He died in San José in 1902.

Bibliography
 Luisa (novella, 1887)
 Mi familia (cuadros de costumbre, 1888)
 Misterio (novel, 1888)
 El huerfanillo de Jericó (novel, 1888)
 Costa Rica pintoresca (short story, 1899)
 Margarita (historical novel, 1899)
 Elisa Delmar (historical novel, 1899)
 La trinchera (historical novel, 1899)
 La bella herediana. El amor a un leproso (short story, 1900)

1834 births
1902 deaths
People from San José, Costa Rica
Costa Rican male writers
Vice presidents of Costa Rica
19th-century Costa Rican judges
Supreme Court of Justice of Costa Rica judges